Joyce Chandler is an American former educator and politician from Georgia. Chandler is a former Republican member of the Georgia House of Representatives representing District 105 from 2013 until January 14, 2019. Chandler has sponsored 125 bills.

Early life 
In 1939, Chandler was born in Georgia.

Education 
Chandler earned a Bachelor of Arts degree in English and Social Studies from Samford University. Chandler earned a Masters of Science degree in School Counseling from Auburn University. Chandler earned an Education Specialist degree in Counseling from Georgia State University. Chandler earned a doctorate degree in Education Counseling from the University of Georgia.

Career 
Chandler is a former teacher and school counselor in Georgia.

On November 6, 2012, Chandler won the election and became a Republican member of Georgia House of Representatives for District 105. Chandler defeated Renita Hamilton with 51.35% of the votes. On November 4, 2014, as an incumbent, Chandler won the election and continued serving District 105. Chandler defeated Renita Hamilton with 52.78% of the votes. On November 8, 2016, as an incumbent, Chandler won the election and continued serving District 105. Chandler defeated Donna McLeod with 50.45% of the votes.

In 2018, Chandler confirmed that she would not seek re-election for Georgia House of Representatives.

Awards 
 2016 Legislator of the Year. Named by Gwinnett County Public Schools. Inaugural winner.
 2016 State Representative of the Year. Presented by Georgia Life Alliance at the Life at the Party for HB 555.

Personal life 
Chandler's husband is Martin Chandler, a retired accountant. They have two children. Chandler and her family live in Grayson, Georgia.

References

External links 
 Joyce Chandler at ballotpedia.org
 Joyce Chandler at facebook.com
 Joyce Chandler at gahousegop.org

21st-century American politicians
21st-century American women politicians
Auburn University alumni
Educators from Georgia (U.S. state)
Georgia State University alumni
Living people
Republican Party members of the Georgia House of Representatives
People from Gwinnett County, Georgia
Samford University alumni
University of Georgia alumni
Women state legislators in Georgia (U.S. state)
1939 births